The Fort Payne Main Street Historic District is a historic district in Fort Payne, Alabama.  Centered on the intersection of Gault Avenue and 1st Street, the district contains commercial and public buildings that date from Fort Payne's second period of growth from the 1920s to World War II.  Buildings from the first wave of development in the 1880s and 1890s are centered in the Fort Payne Boom Town Historic District to the northeast.  Most of the commercial buildings are in a simple, utilitarian brick style.  The later civic buildings exhibit more decorated styles, including the Classical Revival Post Office (built 1936), and the Art Moderne City Hall (1941) and DeKalb County Activities Building (1941).  The district was listed on the National Register of Historic Places in 1989.

References

National Register of Historic Places in DeKalb County, Alabama
Historic districts in DeKalb County, Alabama
Historic districts on the National Register of Historic Places in Alabama